Rex Daniel Grossman Sr. (February 5, 1924 – June 13, 1980) was an American football linebacker and fullback who played for two seasons in the All-America Football Conference (AAFC) and one season in the National Football League (NFL). After playing college football for Indiana, he was drafted by the Philadelphia Eagles in the twenty-ninth round of the 1948 NFL Draft. He played for the Baltimore Colts of the AAFC from 1948 to 1949, until they merged with the NFL in 1950, and for the Detroit Lions of the NFL in 1950. His grandson, Rex, is a former NFL quarterback who played for 11 seasons in the league and started for the Chicago Bears in Super Bowl XLI.

References

1924 births
1980 deaths
American football linebackers
American football fullbacks
People from Huntington, Indiana
Players of American football from Indiana
Indiana Hoosiers football players
Baltimore Colts (1947–1950) players
Detroit Lions players